The Fiat Mephistopheles (known in Italian as Mefistofele) is a one-off racing car created by Ernest A.D. Eldridge in 1923 by combining a Fiat racing car chassis and Fiat aeroplane engine. The name is from the demon of the same name. The name alluded to the infernal noise emitted from the unmuffled engine, and it was "baptised" by the Frenchmen.

The last car to set a land speed record on a public road.

The Mephistopheles was created by combining the chassis of the 1908 Fiat SB4 with a 6-cylinder, 21.7 litre (21706 cc) Fiat A.12 aeroplane engine producing .

Mephistopheles was restored over 5 years, with another example of the same engine, and returned in 2011 with a display at the Goodwood Festival of Speed.

References

External links 
Fiat.com - Story of the Fiat Mefistofele

Mefistofele
Racing cars
Wheel-driven land speed record cars
Cars powered by aircraft engines